The Intercollegiate Ethics Bowl is an annual competitive intercollegiate ethics debate tournament for university students in the United States organized by the Association for Practical and Professional Ethics (APPE). While the term bowl is a reference to American football bowl games, the event itself may have been inspired more directly by the College Bowl quiz show.

The first Ethics Bowl contest was held in 1993 at the Illinois Institute of Technology. Three judges ask each team questions that arise on topics ranging from professional ethics to social and political topics, and team members' responses, to each other as well as to the judges, are then scored by the judges. Since 1997, the national Ethics Bowl Competition has taken place every year at the annual meeting of the Association for Practical and Professional Ethics.

For the past few years ten regional bowls have taken place throughout the U.S. with over 100 teams competing. The top 32 teams are then invited to participate in the national competition. In 2008, a spin-off began, the Bioethics Bowl, which focuses exclusively on ethical issues in health care.

Along with the Intercollegiate Ethics Bowl for undergraduates, a number of other ethics bowl competitions are held, including the Bioethics Bowl and one sponsored by the Society for American Archeology. The Parr Center for Ethics at the University of North Carolina at Chapel Hill is the headquarters for the National High School Ethics Bowl. The National High School Ethics Bowl currently sponsors 36 regional competitions across the United States, excluding two unaffiliated competitions in Canada and England, and the national competition takes place every spring at UNC Chapel Hill. Regional winners participate in a virtual playoff against other high school winners to earn a spot at this national championship.

An international version of the same event has been established using Zoom to bring high school students together called an Ethics Olympiad.

Ethics Bowl format 

While the organization of Ethics Bowl tournaments can vary from region to region, single rounds generally follow a given format.  Four to six weeks before the date of the competition, the competing teams, judges, and moderators are given a packet of case studies that present ethical issues to study. The goal for the teams is both to do research on the cases and to formulate well structured, logical answers to questions asked about the cases.

In each round, the first team gets one of twelve to fifteen cases randomly assigned plus a question from the moderator.   The first team then has ten minutes to present the central moral issues of the cases, as well as alternative points of view. The responding team then comments for five minutes on the first team's analysis, and the first team then responds to these comments for five minutes. Finally, a panel of judges asks questions of the first team for ten minutes. The judges then pause to evaluate the first teams' response and the second team's comments. The round then repeats this format with the second team receiving a question about a different case.

In the national competition of the Intercollegiate Ethics Bowl, during the first evening, each team competes in two rounds against different teams. Two more rounds commence the next morning, and then the top eight teams continue on to the last rounds, all of which are single-elimination: quarter finals, semi finals, and lastly, the final round where the two remaining teams compete to determine the winner.

History  

The Ethics Bowl was developed in 1993 by Dr. Robert Ladenson of the Illinois Institute of Technology. An intramural Ethics Bowl was held at IIT for two years, and in 1995 a small local competition was held where teams from DePaul University, Loyola University, and Western Michigan University were invited to compete against the winning IIT from that year's competition. In 1996, the same four schools participated in the local competition, along with a team from the United States Air Force Academy.

The first nationwide Intercollegiate Ethics Bowl was held in 1997 in Washington, D.C., in conjunction with the annual meeting of the Association for Practical and Professional Ethics. Since that time, the Ethics Bowl has taken place at the APPE annual meeting every year.  The University of Montana won the National Championship in 1997. The United States Military Academy competed in and won the National Championship in 1998 and 1999.  In 2006, due to the number of teams wishing to participate in the Ethics Bowl, regional competitions were held at locations throughout the U.S., and the top-scoring 32 teams were invited to participate in the national competition held in February, 2007.

History of competitions 
 In 2002, Wright State University won the national championship. 
 In 2006, in Jacksonville, Florida, the United States Military Academy won the national championship.
 In 2007, the University of Miami beat Westminster College to win the national championship.
 In 2008 in San Antonio, Texas, Clemson University beat Westminster College in the final round to be national champion.
 In 2009, Indiana University beat Clemson University for the national title.
 In 2010, the University of Alabama at Birmingham (UAB) beat Weber State University to win the national championship.
 In 2011, the University of Central Florida beat Montana State to claim the national championship.
 In 2012, Whitworth University beat Clemson University in the final match for the national championship.
 In 2013, in San Antonio, Texas, DePauw University beat Taylor University in the final match for the national championship.
 In 2014, in Jacksonville, Florida, the University of Montana beat the University of Oklahoma in the final match for the national championship.
 In 2015, in Costa Mesa, California, Taylor University beat Whitworth University in the final match for the national championship.
 In 2016, Whitworth University beat Youngstown State University in the final match for the national championship.
 In 2017, the United States Military Academy beat Youngstown State in the final match for the national championship.
 In 2018, Santa Clara University beat the University of Oklahoma in the final match for the national championship.
 In 2019, Whitworth University beat the University of Alabama at Birmingham (UAB) in the final match for the national championship.
 In 2020, Youngstown State University beat Tufts University in the final match for the national championship.
 In 2021, the University of Cincinnati beat Whitworth University in the final match for the national championship.
 In 2022, Macalester College beat the University of Chicago in the final match for the national championship.
 In 2023, the United States Naval Academy beat Tufts University in the final match for the national championship.

References

External links 

 Official website

Debating competitions
Philosophical debates
Philosophy events